Alper Durur (born April 12, 1971) is a Turkish professional basketball coach. He is the head coach of Galatasaray.

Coaching career

Yakın Doğu Üniversitesi
As of 3 July 2015, he was appointed as Head Coach in Yakın Doğu Üniversitesi.

Çukurova Basketbol
On 5 August 2017, it was announced that an agreement was reached with Çukurova Basketbol. On 3 December 2017, Çukurova Basketbol announced that it was parting ways with head coach Durur.

OGM Ormanspor
On 10 July 2018, it was announced that he signed a 1-year contract with OGM Ormanspor. On 6 June 2022, OGM Ormanspor announced that it was parting ways with head coach Durur.

Galatasaray
He signed a one-year contract with Galatasaray on 7 July 2022.

References

External links
 Alper Durur at Galatasaray.org

1971 births
Sportspeople from Ordu
Living people
Turkish basketball coaches
İstanbul Üniversitesi SK basketball coaches
OGM Ormanspor basketball coaches
Galatasaray S.K. (women's basketball) coaches